Alnus subcordata, the Caucasian alder, is a species in the family Betulaceae, native to Hyrcanian forests of Iran and the Caucasus. It is closely related to the Italian alder (A. cordata) and Alnus orientalis.

It is a deciduous tree growing to 15–25 m tall,  with similar glossy green cordate leaves 5–15 cm long. The flowers are catkins, the male catkins very slender, 8–15 cm long, the female catkins small, maturing into a woody cone-like fruit 2–3 cm long containing numerous small winged seeds.

Two varieties have been recorded:
Alnus subcordata var. subcordata C.A. Mey.
Alnus subcordata var. villosa (Regel) H.J.P.Winkl

Uses
It is a commercially valuable species with "widespread application in timber and furniture industries". It has a calorific value of about 4.6 cal/g.

References

subcordata
Flora of the Caucasus
Trees of Western Asia
Trees of Azerbaijan